The Tennis in the Land, is a tennis tournament for female professional tennis players. It has been held in Cleveland, Ohio, United States, since 2021 and serves as a August warm-up tournament to the US Open. The event is a part of the WTA 250 series of the WTA Tour and is also known as the Cleveland Championships.

Past finals

Singles

Doubles

See also
 Women's Tennis Association
 US Open (tennis)
 US Open Series
 Cleveland Open

References

External links
 WTA profile
 Official website

Recurring sporting events established in 2021
US Open Series
Tennis tournaments in the United States
Hard court tennis tournaments in the United States
2021 establishments in Ohio
WTA Tour
Tennis tournaments in Ohio
Sports competitions in Cleveland
Tennis in Cleveland